The 44th Parliament of Australia was a meeting of the legislative branch of the Australian federal government, composed of the Australian Senate and the Australian House of Representatives.

Major events 

 18 November 2013: Material leaked by NSA contractor Edward Snowden reveals that Australian intelligence agencies had attempted to tap the phones of the President of Indonesia, his wife, and other officials. In response, Indonesia recalls its ambassador, and threatens other consequences.
 10 December 2013: Federal Environment Minister Greg Hunt approves the expansion of the controversial Abbot Point coal terminal in north Queensland.
 11 December 2013: Car manufacturer Holden announces it will cease production of vehicles in Australia by 2017
 13 December 2013: Prime Minister, Tony Abbott, holds his first Council of Australian Governments (COAG) meeting. The states and territories agree to have sole responsibility for the environmental assessment of major developments and to focus on boosting the school attendance rates of Indigenous children. It is confirmed that the national paid parental leave scheme will include state public servants.
 18 December 2013: The Federal Government unveils its $100 million assistance package to help Holden and the manufacturing industry.
 20 December 2013: A two-hour siege took place outside Sydney's Parliament House when a man in his car threatened to set himself alight.
 23 December 2013: A Royal Commission into the Rudd Government's home insulation scheme begins in Brisbane.
 26 December 2013: Acting Prime Minister, Warren Truss, announces that Australia will provide two military aircraft to South Sudan to aid in the current military crisis.
 30 December 2013: Cyclone Christine intensifies into a category 3 cyclone causing heavy rainfall across a large section of the West Australian Pilbara coast. The towns of Roebourne and Wickham receive significant damage.
 4 January 2014: Stradbroke Island suffers bushfires which burn out over 8,500 hectares (21,004 acres) of bushland.
 12–15 January 2014: Perth Hills Fire; A total of 55 homes were razed, 1 fatality, and a damage bill in excess of $13 million.
 15–20 January 2014:Grampians Fire – A fire starts as a result of lightning strikes in the northern Grampians National Park on 15 January. Extreme fire conditions on 17 January saw the fire grow in size to over 50,000 hectares (123,553 acres). The fire was brought under control on 18 January. By the time the fire is contained on 20 January, it had burnt out 55,000 hectares (135,908 acres) hectares. The estimated losses included 90 structures, 32 homes and 3000 sheep.
 20 January 2014: New South Wales Premier Barry O'Farrell uses special legislation to cancel three coal licences worth hundreds of millions of dollars issued by corrupt former Labor minister Ian Macdonald and deny the companies that own them any compensation.
 23 January 2014: Prime Minister Tony Abbott addresses the World Economic Forum in Davos, Switzerland.

Leadership

Senate

Presiding officer 

 President of the Senate: Stephen Parry

Government leadership 

 Leader of the Government: Eric Abetz, until 21 September 2015
 George Brandis, from 21 September 2015
 Deputy Leader of the Government: George Brandis, until 21 September 2015
 Mathias Cormann, from 21 September 2015
 Chief Government Whip: David Bushby
 Deputy Government Whips: David Fawcett; Anne Ruston, until 13 October 2015. 
 Dean Smith, from 13 October 2015
 Manager of Government Business: Mitch Fifield

Opposition leadership 

 Leader of the Opposition: Penny Wong
 Chief Opposition Whip: Anne McEwen 
 Deputy Opposition Whips: Catryna Bilyk; Anne Urquhart
 Manager of Opposition Business: Claire Moore

House of Representatives

Presiding officer 

 Speaker of the House: Bronwyn Bishop, until 2 August 2015
 Tony Smith, from 2 August 2015

Government leadership 

 Leader of the House: Christopher Pyne
 Chief Government Whip: 
 Government Whips:

Opposition leadership 

 Manager of Opposition Business: Tony Burke
 Chief Opposition Whip: Chris Hayes
 Opposition Whips: Jill Hall, Joanne Ryan

Party Summary

Senate

Membership

House of Representatives
All 150 seats in the lower house were contested in the election in September 2013.

Australian Capital Territory
  Gai Brodtmann (Labor)
  Andrew Leigh (Labor)

New South Wales
  Tony Abbott (Liberal)
  Anthony Albanese (Labor)
  John Alexander (Liberal)
  Bob Baldwin (Liberal)
  Sharon Bird (Labor)
  Bronwyn Bishop (Liberal)
  Chris Bowen (Labor)
  Tony Burke (Labor)
  Jason Clare (Labor)
  Sharon Claydon (Labor)
  John Cobb (National)
  David Coleman (Liberal)
  Pat Conroy (Labor)
  Mark Coulton (National)
  Justine Elliot (Labor)
  Laurie Ferguson (Labor)
  Joel Fitzgibbon (Labor)
  Paul Fletcher (Liberal)
  David Gillespie (National)
  Jill Hall (Labor)
  Luke Hartsuyker (National)
  Alex Hawke (Liberal)
  Chris Hayes (Labor)
  Peter Hendy (Liberal)
  Joe Hockey (Liberal)
  Kevin Hogan (National)
  Ed Husic (Labor)
  Stephen Jones (Labor)
  Barnaby Joyce (National)
  Craig Kelly (Liberal)
  Craig Laundy (Liberal)
  Sussan Ley (Liberal)
  Louise Markus (Liberal)
  Russell Matheson (Liberal)
  Michael McCormack (National)
  Karen McNamara (Liberal)
  Scott Morrison (Liberal)
  Julie Owens (Labor)
  Tanya Plibersek (Labor)
  Michelle Rowland (Labor)
  Philip Ruddock (Liberal)
  Fiona Scott (Liberal)
  Ann Sudmalis (Liberal)
  Angus Taylor (Liberal)
  Matt Thistlethwaite (Labor)
  Malcolm Turnbull (Liberal)
  Nickolas Varvaris (Liberal)
  Lucy Wicks (Liberal)
  Trent Zimmerman (Liberal)

Northern Territory
  Natasha Griggs (Country Liberal)
  Warren Snowdon (Labor)

Queensland
  Karen Andrews (Liberal National)
  Mal Brough (Liberal National)
  Scott Buchholz (Liberal National)
  Terri Butler (Labor)
  Jim Chalmers (Labor)
  George Christensen (Liberal National)
  Steven Ciobo (Liberal National)
  Peter Dutton (Liberal National)
  Warren Entsch (Liberal National)
  Teresa Gambaro (Liberal National)
  Luke Howarth (Liberal National)
  Ewen Jones (Liberal National)
  Bob Katter (Katter's Australian)
  Andrew Laming (Liberal National)
  Michelle Landry (Liberal National)
  Ian Macfarlane (Liberal National)
  Shayne Neumann (Labor)
  Ken O'Dowd (Liberal National)
  Clive Palmer (Palmer United)
  Graham Perrett (Labor)
  Keith Pitt (Liberal National)
  Jane Prentice (Liberal National)
  Bernie Ripoll (Labor)
  Stuart Robert (Liberal National)
  Wyatt Roy (Liberal National)
  Kevin Rudd (Labor)
  Bruce Scott (Liberal National)
  Wayne Swan (Labor)
  Warren Truss (Liberal National)
  Bert van Manen (Liberal National)
  Ross Vasta (Liberal National)

South Australia
  Jamie Briggs (Liberal)
  Mark Butler (Labor)
  Nick Champion (Labor)
  Kate Ellis (Labor)
  Tony Pasin (Liberal)
  Christopher Pyne (Liberal)
  Rowan Ramsey (Liberal)
  Amanda Rishworth (Labor)
  Andrew Southcott (Liberal)
  Matt Williams (Liberal)
  Tony Zappia (Labor)

Tasmania
  Julie Collins (Labor)
  Eric Hutchinson (Liberal)
  Andrew Nikolic (Liberal)
  Brett Whiteley (Liberal)

Victoria
  Kevin Andrews (Liberal)

Western Australia
  Julie Bishop (Liberal)
  Ian Goodenough (Liberal)
  Gary Gray (Labor)
  Andrew Hastie (Liberal)
  Steve Irons (Liberal)
  Dennis Jensen (Liberal)
  Michael Keenan (Liberal)
  Nola Marino (Liberal)
  Melissa Parke (Labor)
  Christian Porter (Liberal)
  Melissa Price (Liberal)
  Don Randall (Liberal)
  Luke Simpkins (Liberal)
  Stephen Smith (Labor)
  Rick Wilson (Liberal)
  Ken Wyatt (Liberal)

Coalition

See also 

 45th Parliament of Australia
 Abbott government

Notes

References 

Parliament of Australia